Zafferana Etnea is a comune (municipality) in the Metropolitan City of Catania in the Italian region Sicily, located about  southeast of Palermo and about  north of Catania.

The municipality of Zafferana Etnea contains the frazioni (subdivisions, mainly villages and hamlets) Fleri, Pisano, Petrulli; Sarro-Civita, Passopomo, Airone-Emmaus, Poggiofelice, and Caselle.

Zafferana Etnea borders the following municipalities: Aci Sant'Antonio, Acireale, Adrano, Belpasso, Biancavilla, Bronte, Castiglione di Sicilia, Giarre, Maletto, Milo, Nicolosi, Pedara, Randazzo, Sant'Alfio, Santa Venerina, Trecastagni, Viagrande.

History 
The town spread around the Priory of San Giacomo, founded in 1387 in the upper part of the Valle del Bove, the point of confluence of the lava streams from Etna's eastern craters which frequently have destroyed the town, which has always been rebuilt. Zafferana Etnea was threatened by the 1992 volcanic eruption of Mount Etna. It is now a summer resort with views of landscapes toward both the mountain and the sea.

Culture

In August, every second Sunday of each year, Zafferana Etnea celebrates Festa della Madonna della Provvidenza. It is the most important religious and folkloric celebration of the year and celebrates the Patron Saint of Zafferana Etnea "Madonna della Provvidenza".

In October, the municipality of Zafferana Etnea organizes a unique festival called Ottobrata Zafferanese. It is celebrated every Sunday in October and is an opportunity to partake of local pastries and cakes as well as typical products of the city such as grapes, bottled fruit, mushrooms, honey, liquor, wine, and chestnuts. Handcrafted products made by local artisans are also on display. The festival also presents exhibitions, documentaries about the Etna volcano, shows, and dance performances. The citizens of Zafferana Etnea start preparing in mid-September.

Zafferana, along with Nicolosi, is now regarded as a major tourist stopping point for summer and winter expeditions to the summit of Mt. Etna.

Notable people
Giuseppe Sciuti (1834–1911), painter
Alfio Rapisarda (born 1933), prelate 
Alfio Giuffrida (born 1953), painter and sculptor 
Rosario Di Bella (born 1963), singer and songwriter

References

Cities and towns in Sicily